Lode Runner's Rescue is a 1985 action game developed by Joshua Scholar for the  Commodore 64 and Atari 8-bit family as a follow-up to Doug Smiths's Lode Runner. Lode Runner was published by Broderbund, but the sequel was published under the Synapse Software name, a company acquired by Broderbund in 1984. Lode Runner's Rescue uses isometric projection to give a 3D feel.

Gameplay

Reception
Lode Runner's Rescue was positively received by the press, including Ahoy!, ANALOG Computing, Atari Explorer, and Commodore Magazine which described it as a surprise hit.

Greg Williams of Computer Gaming World praised the Atari version's graphics but asked "How likely is it that a game with girls, mice, cats, and magic mushrooms should be called Lode Runner's Rescue? It's a nice game but, frankly, if that game began its life with the Lode Runner name attached to it, I'm the Mad Hatter." He speculated that the publisher put the series name on an unrelated and independently developed game.

Roy Wagner reviewed the Commodore 64 version for Computer Gaming World, and stated that "This game also has the much favored option to create your own screens with an icon screen editor. An excellent game in all respects."

References

External links
Lode Runner's Rescue at Atari Mania

1985 video games
Action video games
Atari 8-bit family games
Commodore 64 games
Single-player video games
Video game sequels
Video games developed in the United States
Video games featuring female protagonists
Video games with isometric graphics